Alfred Cragg Warner (born April 1879) was an English footballer who played in the Football League for Notts County.

References

1872 births
1949 deaths
English footballers
Association football forwards
English Football League players
Notts Rangers F.C. players
Notts County F.C. players
Tottenham Hotspur F.C. players
Luton Town F.C. players